Kris Wauters (born 21 December 1964) is a Flemish artist, active with the band Clouseau combined with his brother Koen Wauters.

Belgian musicians
1964 births
Living people
21st-century Belgian musicians
20th-century Belgian musicians
Eurovision Song Contest entrants of 1991
Eurovision Song Contest entrants for Belgium
24 Hours of Daytona drivers